Bentzon is a surname. Notable people with the surname include:

 Jørgen Bentzon (1897–1951), Danish composer 
 Niels Viggo Bentzon (1919–2000), Danish composer and pianist 
Peter Bentzon (–), Danish West Indies-born American master silversmith 
 Thérèse Bentzon (Marie Thérèse Blanc, 1840–1907), French writer

See also
 Bentson